The 2012 MAVTV 500 IndyCar World Championships was the 15th and final showdown of the 2012 IndyCar Series season. The event took place on September 15, at the  Auto Club Speedway in Fontana, California. It was the first IndyCar race at this facility since 2005, the first 500-mile open-wheel race outside Indianapolis since the CART-sanctioned 2002 The 500 at Fontana (the planned 2003 CART race was canceled due to wildfires in the area), and the first 500-mile IndyCar Series race outside Indianapolis.

The race, originally scheduled for 400 miles (200 laps), as was the case for the 2002–05 IndyCar races at Auto Club Speedway, reverted to the classic 500 mile, 250-lap distance used at the Ontario Motor Speedway for major races and both the six CART FedEx Championship Series races (1997–2002) and the first 20 NASCAR Sprint Cup races (1997–2010) held at Auto Club Speedway.  Attendance at the event was estimated to be 25,000 to 30,000 people.

Report

Qualifying
Over half the field incurred 10-place grid penalties for engine changes, most for an unapproved engine change – engines must clock 1850 miles before they be changed without penalty – however both championship contenders Will Power and Ryan Hunter-Reay incurred a penalty for exceeding the five engine limit for the year, both of whom fit their sixth Chevrolet engine.

Classification

Starting grid

Race results

Notes
 Points include 1 point for pole position and 2 points for most laps led.

References

MAVTV 500
MAVTV
MAVTV 500 IndyCar World Championships
MAVTV 500 IndyCar World Championships